Les Éparges is a commune in the Meuse department in Grand Est in north-eastern France.

A ridge to the east of the village was the site of a fierce battle during World War I, and there are many memorials and monuments in the area.

See also
Communes of the Meuse department
Parc naturel régional de Lorraine

References

Eparges